Johan Berg (12 May 1917 – September 1981) was a Norwegian military officer.

Career
Berg was born in Stange to Sigvart Berg and Borghild Evenrud. He graduated as military officer in 1939. From 1939 to 1940 he served as lieutenant with the 6th Division, and from 1940 to 1945 with the Norwegian Armed Forces in exile in the United Kingdom. He continued his military career after the Second World War. In 1966 he succeeded Vilhelm Evang as head of the Norwegian Intelligence Service. From 1970 he served as head of Distriktskommando Vestlandet with the rank of major general. He edited the journal Norsk Militært Tidsskrift from 1957 to 1966. Berg died after a long illness in September 1981, 64 years old.

Awards
Berg was decorated Knight of the Danish Order of the Dannebrog. He was awarded the Norwegian Defence Medal 1940–1945 and Haakon VII 70th Anniversary Medal.

References

1917 births
1981 deaths
People from Stange
Norwegian Army generals
Norwegian Army personnel of World War II
Norwegian expatriates in the United Kingdom
Norwegian journal editors
Norwegian military writers
Knights of the Order of the Dannebrog